Benjamin Nicaise (born 28 September 1980) is a retired French footballer.

Honours
 Standard Liège
 Belgian First Division A: 2008–09
 Belgian Super Cup: 2008

References

External links

Profile at epae.org

1980 births
Living people
Association football midfielders
French footballers
People from Maisons-Alfort
AS Nancy Lorraine players
FC Metz players
Amiens SC players
Panthrakikos F.C. players
Standard Liège players
Lierse S.K. players
R.A.E.C. Mons players
Ligue 1 players
Ligue 2 players
Belgian Pro League players
French expatriate footballers
French football managers
R.W.D.M. Brussels F.C. managers
Expatriate footballers in Belgium
French expatriate sportspeople in Belgium
Expatriate footballers in Greece
French expatriate sportspeople in Greece
Footballers from Val-de-Marne